Grandview is an unincorporated urban community in the Grandview Municipality within the Canadian province of Manitoba that held town status prior to January 1, 2015. It is located 45 kilometres west of the City of Dauphin along the Valley River.

The community was named for the picturesque views of both the Duck Mountains to the north and the Riding Mountains to the south. The main access to the community is Provincial Highway 5. Grandview railway station is served by Via Rail.

The local economy is agriculturally and service industry based. However, at one time a thriving economy was also based on a local wood mill.

Demographics 

References 

Designated places in Manitoba
Unincorporated communities in Parkland Region, Manitoba
Unincorporated urban communities in Manitoba
Former towns in Manitoba
Populated places disestablished in 2015
2015 disestablishments in Manitoba